Leoš Friedl and Andrei Pavel were the defending champions, but chose not to participate together. Friedl played alongside František Čermák, but lost in the first round to Juan Ignacio Chela and Luis Horna. Pavel teamed up with Rogier Wassen, but lost in the first round to Tomáš Cibulec and Łukasz Kubot.

Philipp Kohlschreiber and Stefan Koubek won the title, defeating Oliver Marach and Cyril Suk in the final, 6–2, 6–3.

Seeds

Draw

References
 Main Draw

Austrian Open - Doubles
Doubles